XS Games, LLC was a New York-based publisher of value-priced video games, operating in North America and Europe, that released titles on numerous different consoles as well as one title on the iPhone. The company is still listed as operating and recently, as a division of  LLC, but has not released any new titles since 2011. In addition, their corporate headquarters is now listed as a residential address and their web site has displayed a basic coming soon page since 2022. It is unclear what the company's future is.

Publications

Sony PlayStation games

Hugo: The Evil Mirror
Jigsaw Madness(a.k.a. Jigsaw Island: Japan Graffiti)
Mobile Light Force (a.k.a. Gunbird)
Monster Bass!
Sol Divide
Sorcerers Maze (a.k.a. Prism Land)
Superstar Dance Club #1 Hitz
Virtual Pool 3
XS Airboat Racing
XS Junior League Football
XS Junior League Dodgeball
XS Junior League Soccer
XS Moto

Sony PlayStation 2 games

Castle Shikigami 2
Digital Hitz Factory
DT Racer
Mobile Light Force 2 (a.k.a. Shikigami No Shiro)
PopStar Guitar
Rebel Raiders: Operation Nighthawk
Still Life
Super PickUps
Super Trucks Racing
The Red Star
War Chess
Rebel Raiders

Microsoft Xbox Games

Knights Apprentice, Memorick's Adventures
Pure Pinball
Still Life
Syberia
Syberia II

Nintendo DS games

Commando: Steel Disaster
Aqua Panic!

Nintendo Game Boy Advance games

Ten Pin Alley
Thunder Alley
XS Moto

Nintendo Wii games

Power Punch
My Personal Golf Trainer with IMG Academies and David Leadbetter
Aqua Panic!
Crazy Mini Golf 2
Bass Pro Shops: The Hunt - Trophy Showdown
Bass Pro Shops: The Hunt
Bass Pro Shops: The Strike - Tournament Edition
Bass Pro Shops: The Strike
Junior League Sports (Kidz Sports Series Compilation)
PopStar Guitar
Rebel Raiders: Operation Nighthawk
Super PickUps
Ten Pin Alley 2

PC games

Bass Pro Shops: The Strike
Chicago 1930
Syberia II
Wanted Dead or Alive
Sanitarium
War Chess

Mobile Light Force
In the 2000s, XS localized two unrelated Japanese shooter games to North America, rebranding them under the Mobile Light Force name. The first Mobile Light Force was a PlayStation version of Gunbird, while Mobile Light Force 2 was the PlayStation 2 version of Shikigami No Shiro. Both are very poorly regarded by fans of the genre, since XS removed many important features from the games (most notably all of their in-game plot).

XS also translated Shikigami No Shiro II, and released it for the PlayStation 2 under its own name, Castle Shikigami 2.

References

External links
 List of games published by XS Games, LLC @ Yahoo! Games Domain

Companies based in New York (state)
Video game companies of the United States
Video game publishers